The 1973 Railway Cup Hurling Championship was the 47th staging of the Railway Cup since its establishment by the Gaelic Athletic Association in 1927. The cup began on 28 January 1973 and ended on 17 March 1973.

Leinster were the defending champions.

On 17 March 1973, Leinster won the cup following a 1-13 to 2-08 defeat of Munster in the final. This was their 14th Railway Cup title overall and their third title in succession.

Leinster's Eddie Keher was the championship's top scorer with 1-15.

Results

Preliminary round

Semi-finals

Final

Bibliography

 Donegan, Des, The Complete Handbook of Gaelic Games (DBA Publications Limited, 2005).

References

Railway Cup Hurling Championship
Railway Cup Hurling Championship
Hurling